Qin Guangrong (born 25 December 1950) is a former Chinese politician. He previous served as deputy chair of the committee on internal legal affairs of the National People's Congress, from 2014 to 2018, the Communist Party Secretary of Yunnan province, the province's top political office, from 2011 to October 2014. Prior to that he was the Governor of Yunnan. Qin is related to that of his son Qin Ling, former chairman of Huarong Investment Stock Corp. His son Qin Ling was under investigation as part of the corruption scandal at the Huarong Asset Management Co. Ltd., one of China's four state-run bad-asset disposal companies. He is the first leader of provincial level to spontaneously hand himself in to the anti-corruption agency of China.

Early life and education
Qin was born in Yongzhou, Hunan on December 25, 1950. He attended Hengyang Normal University, majoring in Chinese language.

Career
After graduating, he was dispatched to the Lingling campus of Hunan Normal University. He then entered the Communist Youth League system as a provincial functionary, eventually working his way up to leading positions. In June 1993, he became party chief of Changsha at the age of 38; a year later he joined the provincial party standing committee.

In January 1999, he was transferred to the southwestern province of Yunnan to become the provincial Political and Legal Affairs secretary, then cycled through the offices of organization department head, executive vice governor, and Deputy Party Secretary. He was first appointed the Governor of Yunnan in January 2007. He was re-elected as Governor by the Yunnan Provincial People's Congress on January 24, 2008.

Qin was named the Party Secretary for Yunnan in November 2011.

In mid September 2013, Qin led a delegation of more than 200 people to visit Taiwan. While in Taiwan, Qin met with the former Chairman of Kuomintang, Wu Po-hsiung. During the meeting, Qin encouraged Taiwanese businessmen to invest in Yunnan and make use of the province as the gateway to Southeast Asia and South Asia, creating business opportunities. He added that Yunnan welcomes Taiwanese farmers, township wardens, teachers, students, media and religious and business representatives.

Aftermath of Yunnan corruption cases
In 2014, a large number of corruption investigations were opened in Yunnan province, involving former provincial party chief Bai Enpei, former provincial governor Shen Peiping, and former Kunming executive vice mayor Li Xi. Zhang Tianxin, the former party chief of the provincial capital, Kunming, was also demoted as a result of a party investigation. As part of the overall efforts to get to the bottom of corruption cases in the province, Qin Guangrong was asked to step down as party chief in October 2014. Before he left his post he was said to have told his subordinates, "I am going to go somewhere else to work now. Thank you for everything." Subsequently, Qin was named Vice Chair of the internal legal affairs committee of the National People's Congress.

Qin was an alternate member of the 15th and 16th Central Committees of the Chinese Communist Party, and a full member of the 17th, and 18th Central Committees.

Downfall
On May 9, 2019, Qin turned himself in to the government. Qin Guangrong was placed under investigation by the Central Commission for Discipline Inspection (CCDI), the party's internal disciplinary body, and the National Supervisory Commission, the highest anti-corruption agency of China. His predecessor, Bai Enpei, was put under investigation in August 2014 and given a suspended death sentence in October 2016. Qiu He, one of Qin's deputies, was being investigated in March 2015 and was sentenced for 14 years and 6 months in prison for accepting bribes of more than 24 million yuan (about 3.7 million U.S. dollar).

On September 26, 2019, Qin had been expelled from the Chinese Communist Party. Qin's case was handed over to the Procuratorate of Chengdu on in November 2019 and went on trial in the Chengdu Municipal Intermediate People's Court on September 10, 2019.

On September 10, 2020, Qin stood trial at the Chengdu Municipal People's Court on charges of taking bribes. The public prosecutors accused him of taking advantage of his former positions in Yunnan to seek profits for various companies and individuals in project contracting, equity transfer and job promotions between 2003 and 2014. In return, he accepted money and gifts worth more than 23.89 million yuan (over 3.49 million U.S. dollars) personally or through his family members.

On January 19, 2021, he was sentenced to seven years in prison for bribery and was also fined 1.5 million yuan (~$231,000) by the Chengdu Municipal Intermediate People's Court. The court said that he was given a reduced sentence for turning himself in and returning the money he took.

Personal life
Qin married Huang Yulan. Their son, Qin Ling, was former president of Huarong Investment Stock Corp. Qin Ling was one of the seven executives present of companies linked to the former Huarong boss Lai Xiaomin.

References

External links
Who's Who in China's Leadership
Biography - China Vitae

1950 births
Politicians from Yongzhou
Governors of Yunnan
Living people
People's Republic of China politicians from Hunan
Chinese Communist Party politicians from Hunan
Members of the 17th Central Committee of the Chinese Communist Party
Members of the 18th Central Committee of the Chinese Communist Party
Hengyang Normal University alumni
Expelled members of the Chinese Communist Party